Limardo is a surname. Notable people with the surname include:

 Francisco Limardo (born 1987), Venezuelan fencer
 Jesús Limardo (born 1996), Venezuelan fencer
 Maria Limardo (born 1960), Italian politician
 Rubén Limardo (born 1985), Venezuelan fencer

Surnames of Italian origin